Religion in Sokoto State of Nigeria is mainly Islam. The Sharia is valid in the entire state. The Roman Catholic Diocese of Sokoto has its seat in the state. The Churches of Christ are present in the state.

See also 
Nigerian sectarian violence

References 

Sokoto State
Religion in Nigeria